Ingrown hair is a condition where a hair curls back or grows sideways into the skin. The condition is most prevalent among people who have coarse or curly hair. It may or may not be accompanied by an infection of the hair follicle (folliculitis) or "razor bumps" (pseudofolliculitis barbae), which vary in size. While ingrown hair most commonly appears in areas where the skin is shaved or waxed (beard, legs, pubic region), it can appear anywhere.  Anything that causes the hair to be broken off unevenly with a sharp tip can cause ingrown hairs. Ingrown hairs are also caused because of lack of natural exfoliation in the skin.

Signs and symptoms
Symptoms include rash, itching skin, and hair that remains in spite of shaving. The site of the ingrown hair forms a reddish, raised bump, similar in appearance to a pimple.

Prevention
When shaving, a few precautions  can be taken to avoid taking showers and preparation of the skin before shaving. When shaving, applying the proper amount of lubrication (in the form of shaving cream, gel, or soap) is important, to prevent the hair from being forced underneath the surface of the skin. In addition, the application of too much force with a razor can contribute to hair that is cut shorter than the surrounding dermis. Using a beard trimmer at the lowest setting (1.0 or 0.5 mm) instead of shaving is an effective alternative.

Alternatively, ingrown hair can be prevented by removing the hair permanently, e.g. by laser hair removal or hair removal through electrolysis.

Not enough exfoliation before and after hair removal causes hairs to become ingrown. Daily exfoliation prevents the accumulation of excess skin, which can allow hair to properly grow above the skin. Preventative tools include chemical exfoliation: coffee scrub, liquids, creams or physical exfoliation: gloves, loofah, or an ingrown hair prevention brush with the soft and firm bristles.

Treatment
The many different treatments are available for ingrown hairs:
 They can be removed with tweezers (though this can be painful) or dislodged with a rotable medical device for ingrown hairs.
 Some people who chronically get ingrown hairs use laser treatment or electrolysis to completely prevent hair growth.
 There are different products that prevent or cure ingrown hairs. Some are alcohol-based, while others are alcohol-free. For some, alcohol can cause skin irritation and thus alcohol-free products may be preferred.
 Prophylactic treatments include twice-daily topical application of diluted glycolic acid.
 Twice a day application of benzoyl peroxide for several days or weeks is effective in treating ingrown hairs.
 Applying salicylic acid solution is also a common remedy for ingrown hairs caused by waxing or shaving.
 Use an exfoliating glove in the shower and exfoliate the area every day.

Other treatments include putting a warm washcloth over the ingrown hair, shaving in a different direction, exfoliating with facial scrubs, brushes, sponges, towels, salves, or creams containing acids, and ibuprofen or other nonsteroidal anti-inflammatory drugs.

See also
Hair splinter
Pilonidal disease

References

External links 

 How to get rid of ingrown hair - SkinHow.Org

Conditions of the skin appendages
Hair diseases